The men's 100 metre backstroke S7 event at the 2012 Paralympic Games took place on 30 August, at the London Aquatics Centre in the Olympic Park, London. The event was for athletes included in the S7 classification, which is for competitors with physical impairments. Sixteen swimmers took part, representing a total of eleven different nations. Great Britain's Jonathan Fox set a new world record in the heats and went on to win the gold medal.

Competition

Heats
Two heats were held, each with eight swimmers; the swimmers with the eight fastest times advanced to the final. The heats took place on 30 August starting at 10:39 BST.

Yevheniy Bohodayko of Ukraine won the first heat in a time of one minute 12.79 seconds. Bohodayko qualified for the final along with Mihovil Spanja of Croatia, fellow Ukrainian Marian Kvasnytsia and China's Nan Gao. Nan Gao set a new Asian record time of one minute 15.05 seconds.

British swimmer Jonathan Fox broke his own world record, setting a time of one minute 9.86 seconds to win heat 2 and qualify fastest for the final. Other qualifiers from the second heat were Guillermo Marro of Argentina, Andrey Gladkov of Russia and Ievgen Poltavskyi of Ukraine.

Final
The final took place on 30 August 2012 at 18:52 BST. Jonathan Fox won the gold medal in a time of one minute 10.46 seconds, earning Great Britain's first swimming gold medal of the Games. Silver went to Ukraine's Bohodayko, who finished 0.85 seconds behind the winner, and the bronze to Spanja of Croatia. Chinese swimmer Nan Gao finished in seventh position but broke the Asian record which he had set in the heats. Marian Kvasnytsia was disqualified.

Results
Key
 Qualified for next round
AS = Asian record
WR = World record

Heats

Heat 1

Heat 2

Final

References

Swimming at the 2012 Summer Paralympics